The Strategy Paradox is a business strategy book by author Michael E. Raynor, who is the Distinguished Fellow with Deloitte Research. The Strategy Paradox was published in 2007 by Currency/Doubleday.  It was named a top ten book of 2007 by BusinessWeek, and a top five strategy book of 2007 by Strategy+Business.

Synopsis

The Strategy Paradox, the title and focus of the book sets up a ubiquitous but little-understood tradeoff.  The tradeoff is that most strategies are built on specific beliefs about an unpredictable future, but current strategic approaches force leaders to commit to an inflexible strategy regardless of how the future might unfold. It is this commitment to uncertainty that is the cause of "the strategy paradox."

Reviews

National Post With the right strategy, you can take big risks and win. By John Worsley Simpson, Financial Post 
BusinessWeek Sidstepping Disaster. By Dean Foust 
The Financial Times Take a strategic risk but hedge your bets. By Fergal Byrne 
Boston Globe For CEOs, admitting uncertainty can be the key to success. By Robert Weisman 
Harvard Business Review By Anand P. Raman

References

Further reading

Raynor, M. E. 2005. Strategic Flexibility: Corporate-level Real Options as a Response to Uncertainty in the Pursuit of Strategic Integration. In Bower, Joseph L., and Clark Gilbert, eds., From Resource Allocation to Strategy, UK, Oxford University Press. Chapter 14.
Raynor, Michael E. 2002. Strategic Flexibility: Charting a Path Through Uncertainty. Convergence Magazine (South African edition), Vol. 2(4).
Raynor, Michael E. 2002. Make Peace with Business Uncertainty. Optimize. August.

External links
 Website of author Michael E. Raynor
 The Strategy Paradox on Amazon
 Interview with Emerald Management First
 Interview with Ivey Business Journal

2007 non-fiction books
Business books
Doubleday (publisher) books